Paulina Brandberg (born 11 November 1983) is a Swedish politician for the Liberals. Since 18 October 2022 she is the Minister of Equality in the Ulf Kristersson cabinet.

References

1983 births
Living people
Liberals (Sweden) politicians
Women government ministers of Sweden
Swedish Ministers for Gender Equality